Marcelle de Heredia Lapicque (1873 – 1960) was a French neurophysiologist known for her research on nerve impulses (chronaxie) and the effects of poisons, especially strychnine, on chronaxie. She was in charge of the Laboratoire des Hautes-Études General Physiology laboratory until her death. Marcelle Lapicque, though overshadowed in histories of science by her husband, Louis Lapicque, was an influential scientist in her own right, publishing many papers as sole author and holding a membership to the Société de Biologie. Louis Lapicque "insisted on the importance of his wife as equal co-worker in all his research".

She was the daughter of French politician Severiano de Heredia.

References 

French neuroscientists
French women scientists
French women neuroscientists
French people of Dominican Republic descent
1873 births
1960 deaths